Sokolče is a former village which was situated in the Liptov region of Slovakia. The village was inundated by the reservoir Liptovská Mara in 1975.

Famous residents 
 Stan Mikita - NHL star, member of Hockey Hall of Fame
 Ján Starší (1933–2019), Slovak ice-hockey player, member of IIHF Hall of Fame
 Vladimír Šmihula (*1943), Slovak journalist
 Michal Vyšný (*1915- †1980, Peterborough, UK), Slovak Protestant priest and Czechoslovak officer

Former villages in Slovakia
Liptovský Mikuláš District